Leonardo José Peres (born 7 April 1992), commonly known as Léo, is a Brazilian professional footballer who currently plays for Hong Kong Premier League club HKFC.

References

Living people
1992 births
People from Passo Fundo
Brazilian footballers
Association football forwards
Clube Esportivo Bento Gonçalves players
Hong Kong First Division League players
Hong Kong Premier League players
South China AA players
Hong Kong FC players
Brazilian expatriate footballers
Brazilian expatriate sportspeople in Hong Kong
Expatriate footballers in Hong Kong
Sportspeople from Rio Grande do Sul